DXKP (1377 AM) Radyo Ronda is a radio station owned and operated by Radio Philippines Network. The station's studios are located at Benigno Aquino St., Pagadian.

References

Radio stations in Zamboanga del Sur
Radio Philippines Network
RPN News and Public Affairs
Radio stations established in 1974
News and talk radio stations in the Philippines